The name Imelda was used for one tropical cyclones in the Atlantic Ocean and one in the south-West Indian Ocean.

In the Atlantic:
 Tropical Storm Imelda (2019) – the tropical storm that was the fifth-wettest overall in the contiguous United States.

In the South-West Indian:
 Cyclone Imelda (2013) – did not affect land.

Atlantic hurricane set index articles
South-West Indian Ocean cyclone set index articles